The women's high jump at the 2019 Asian Athletics Championships was held on 23 April.

Results

References

High
High jump at the Asian Athletics Championships
2019 in women's athletics